Adaeze Yobo (born Adaeze Stephanie Chinenye Igwe) is the Most Beautiful Girl in Nigeria 2008 and represented Nigeria at the Miss World 2008. She is Igbo from Anambra State.

She pursued her childhood dream by representing Anambra in the MBGN pageant with 29 other girls. Like Ann Suinner before her, Yobo's platform was Sickle Cell Awareness; she also used her reign as a platform to showcase Nigerian talent. 
Apart from winning five million naira, a Hyundai car, and endorsement deals, Awka-Etiti-native Yobo represented Nigeria at Miss World 2008 in South Africa. She made the top twenty in Miss World Talent, and placed second in Miss World Sports.

During her reign, Yobo established her own charity The Adaeze Igwe Foundation, an organisation which promotes AIDS and breast cancer awareness, and raises funds towards similar causes, including malaria and tuberculosis. Its mission was "to create and increase access and opportunities to Nigerian youths and communities towards addressing [their] needs and challenges in relation to health and sustainable development."
 She attended a short course at the New York Film Academy.

In 2010, Yobo married former Nigerian international soccer player Joseph Yobo in a midnight ceremony held in Jos after a brief courtship, and are now the parents of two sons and a daughter.

In 2011, Yobo was ranked 92 in a list of 101 Sexiest Soccer Wives and Girlfriends, as compiled by Bleacher Report.

In 2014, Adaeze was listed as the 4th Most beautiful African Sportsman wife.

References

External links 
 MBGN Website
 Adaeze Yobo Most Beautiful African Sports Wife
 Adaze Igwe Interview
 Adaze is Queen -Rhythm FM
 Adaeze Igwe Weds Joseph Yobo

1990 births
Living people
Association footballers' wives and girlfriends
Igbo beauty pageant contestants
Miss World 2008 delegates
Most Beautiful Girl in Nigeria winners
Nigerian female models
People from Anambra State
Igbo people